Desouk Sporting Club (Egyptian Arabic: نادي دسوق  Nady Desouk) is an Egyptian football club based in Desouk, Kafr El Sheikh, Egypt. The team is a member of the Egyptian 3rd Division Group 8.

See also

 Desouk Stadium
 Desouk
 Desouki
 Ibrahim El-Desouki

Football clubs in Egypt
Association football clubs established in 1966
Clubs and societies in Egypt
Desouk
1966 establishments in Egypt